Anosibe An'ala District is a district in the Alaotra-Mangoro region in Madagascar. Its capital is Anosibe An'ala.

Communes
The district is further divided into 11 communes:

 Ambalaomby
 Ambatoharanana
 Ambodimerana
 Ampandoantraka
 Ampasimaneva
 Anosibe An'ala
 Antandrokomby
 Longozabe
 Niarovana Marosampanana
 Tratramarina
 Tsaravinany

References

Districts of Alaotra-Mangoro